Itä-Häme is a morning tabloid newspaper published in Heinola in the Itä-Häme, Finland.

History and profile
Itä-Häme was established 1927 in Sysmä. The newspaper is headquartered in Lahti. It is part of the ESS company. Its chief editor is Jari Niemi. The paper is published six times per week. Its format was broadsheet until 2005 when the paper began to be published in tabloid format. It is the first Finnish newspaper which institutionalized the post of civic reporter in 2004.

The circulation of Itä-Häme was 13,900 copies. It was 12,000 copies in 2006. The paper had a circulation of 10,719 copies in 2010 and 10,427 copies in 2011.

References

External links
Official site

1927 establishments in Finland
Daily newspapers published in Finland
Finnish-language newspapers
Publications established in 1927